Jerzy Słaboszowski (4 April 1932 – either 2 or 4 April 1981) also sometimes written as Jerzy Słaboszewski was a football player and manager. During his playing career Słaboszowski played for Mieszko Piast Cieszyn, Cracovia, Legia Warsaw, Lublinianka, and Warszawianka. His greatest spell coming with Legia, winning the Polish Cup in 1955 and the league in the same year. During his coaching career he managed Lechia Gdańsk, finishing runners up in the league, also managing Arka Gdynia, Stilon Gorzów Wielkopolski and Olimpia Elbląg. Słaboszowski was the first Polish manager to manage in both Libya and the United Arab Emirates, managing both Al Jazeera Zuwara and Al Ahli Dubai, the latter with whom he won the 1975–76 United Arab Emirates league. 

There uncertainty on which date Słaboszowski died, with sources listing either 2 April 1981 or that he died on his birthday on 4 April 1981, this would either put his age as 48 or 49 at his time of death.

Honours
Legia Warsaw
I liga
Winners: 1955
Polish Cup
Winners: 1955

Lechia Gdańsk
III liga
Runners-up: 1970-71

Al Ahli Dubai
UAE Football League
Winners: 1975–76

References

1932 births
1981 deaths
Polish footballers
Polish football managers
Lechia Gdańsk managers
Footballers from Kraków
Association football defenders
MKS Cracovia (football) players
Legia Warsaw players